Zdeněk Kolář and Andrea Vavassori were the defending champions but chose not to defend their title.

Seeds

Draw

References

External links
 Main draw

Zadar Open - Doubles